Winslow House may refer to:

in the United States (by state then city)
Winslow House (River Forest, Illinois), a Frank Lloyd Wright-designed home listed on the National Register of Historic Places (NRHP) in Cook County
Borden–Winslow House, Fall River, Massachusetts, listed on the NRHP in Bristol County
Luther Winslow Jr. House, Fall River, Massachusetts, listed on the NRHP in Bristol County
Isaac Winslow House, Marshfield, Massachusetts, listed on the NRHP
Winslow–Haskell Mansion, Newton, Massachusetts, listed on the NRHP in Middlesex County
Winslow–Turner Carriage House, Plattsburgh, New York, listed on the NRHP in Clinton County
Wilson–Winslow House, Coventry, Rhode Island, listed on the NRHP in Kent County
Earle Micajah Winslow House, Arlington, Virginia, listed on the NRHP in Arlington County
Colburn T. Winslow House, Colville, Washington, listed on the NRHP in Stevens County, Washington
George F. Winslow House, Eau Claire, Wisconsin, listed on the NRHP in Eau Claire County, Wisconsin

See also
Goodwinslow, Raleigh, Tennessee, listed on the NRHP in Shelby County, Tennessee
Winslow Hall, house in Winslow, Buckinghamshire, United Kingdom